Eugenio Moggi is a professor of computer science at the University of Genoa, Italy.

He first described the general use of monads to structure programs.

Biography 
Academic qualifications:
 Ph.D. in Computer Science, University of Edinburgh 1988
 Laurea in Computer Science, University of Pisa 1983
 Diploma, Scuola Normale Superiore di Pisa 1983

References

External links 
 Personal page of Eugenio Moggi at the University of Genoa.
 

Italian computer scientists
Living people
Alumni of the University of Edinburgh
Year of birth missing (living people)